Giampaolo Medda (8 August 1927 – 3 May 2017) was an Italian field hockey player. He competed at the 1952 Summer Olympics and the 1960 Summer Olympics.

References

External links
 

1927 births
2017 deaths
Italian male field hockey players
Olympic field hockey players of Italy
Field hockey players at the 1952 Summer Olympics
Field hockey players at the 1960 Summer Olympics
Sportspeople from Sardinia
People from the Province of Cagliari